The Midnight Hour is a 1985 American made-for-television comedy horror film directed by Jack Bender and starring Shari Belafonte-Harper, LeVar Burton, Peter DeLuise, and Dedee Pfeiffer.  Its plot focuses on a small New England town that becomes overrun with zombies, witches, vampires, and all the other demons of hell after a group of teenagers unlocks a centuries-old curse on Halloween.

The film aired on ABC on Friday, November 1, 1985, at 9:00-11:00 pm EST. In addition to an original musical number, "Get Dead", the film's soundtrack features songs by Wilson Pickett, Creedence Clearwater Revival, Sam the Sham and the Pharaohs, Three Dog Night, and The Smiths. The film marks Macaulay Culkin's first screen role as an uncredited trick-or-treater.

Plot 
It is Halloween in the small town of Pitchford Cove, Massachusetts, and five high school friends, Phil (Lee Montgomery), Mary (Pfeiffer), Mitch (DeLuise), Vinnie (Burton), and Melissa (Belafonte-Harper), plan on making it a night they will never forget. They steal outfits from the town's historic museum and come upon other old artifacts, including an old trunk encasing a paper scroll which contains an ancient curse. When Melissa, latent sorceress, recites the curse at the local cemetery, things take a turn for the worse.

The town's dead, led by Melissa's great-great-great-great-grandmother Lucinda Cavender (Jonelle Allen), a witch who was put to death 300 years earlier, rise up from their graves and roam the town. As Melissa, Vinnie, Mitch, and Mary enjoy themselves at their annual Halloween costume party, Phil encounters a mysterious girl, named Sandra "Sandy" Matthews (Jonna Lee), dressed in a vintage 1950's cheerleader outfit, who warns him that the whole town is in danger.

Meanwhile, Lucinda and the various undead crash the costume party. At first, nobody pays much attention to them since everyone is in costume. However, Lucinda begins turning the party guests into vampires, starting with her great-great-great-great-granddaughter Melissa.

When Sandy discovers that Phil and his friends recited the ancient spell in the cemetery, they realize that the whole town is being overrun by the living dead and decide to team up to break the curse. The only way to do so is to find the Grenville Spirit Ring inside the grave of a witch-hunter Nathaniel Grenville - who, coincidentally, was Phil's great-great-great-great-grandfather and slave owner of Lucinda Cavender, her arch-nemesis - and use it to undo the curse.  Phil and "good ghost" Sandy must restore the town to normal by midnight before it is too late and the curse becomes permanent.

When the local police do not take Phil and Sandy's warning seriously, Phil manages to get his father's hunting rifle to make silver bullets from his father's silver coin collection so they can use the silver bullets which appears to be effective against the undead. When the couple ventures to the Halloween party, they discover everyone turned into zombies, vampires, witches or other evil creatures. Phil manages to get the Grenville Spirit Ring from Zombie Mitch, after which he and Sandy drive to the town's cemetery. They break into Grenville's crypt and take his bones-and-dust remains to use to seal the scroll, just as Lucinda and the horde of undead attack. Cornered in Phil's car, he and Sandy manage to use candle wax to seal the parchment scroll. After Sandy tells Phil she loves him, every creature resurrected on that night vanishes, the wounds that Phil sustains disappear, and the damage to his car is undone—as if the entire event had never happened.

Phil finds Sandy's grave and finally understands that she had been one of the undead too. As the clock strikes midnight, Phil begins to drive back to town when he hears a music dedication on his car radio from 'Sandy,' implying that she will always be looking after him even from beyond the grave.

Cast

Release
The Midnight Hour had its world premiere on ABC on Friday, November 1, 1985, at 9:00-11:00 pm EST. The film later aired on occasion during the Halloween season, with an 8 pm airing on the Lifetime network on Wednesday, October 31, 1990. Lifetime continued to air the film on numerous occasions during afternoon time slots, including showings on December 27, 1990, June 19, 1992, and October 31, 1992.

Critical response

Contemporaneous
Rick Sherwood of the San Bernardino Sun deemed the film a "less-than-satisfying teenage monster movie," adding: "The two-hour made-for-TV movie is billed as a humorous horror romp, but The Midnight Hour is really a campy monster bash in which revived corpses break into song and dance. Expect neither tricks nor treats, just lots of rock music, fake-looking special effects, and slow-moving scenes." A review published in The Des Moines Register noted: "The plot is contrived and simple, but the special effects, makeup, and costumes (done by the same person who staged Michael Jackson's "Thriller" video) may be worth the watch," while a review in The Tennessean described the film as "a sophomoric concoction about a bunch of teenagers who conjure up a gang of goblins." Leonard Maltin wrote in his 1987 film guide that The Midnight Hour was "below average...[a] bland concoction of teen comedies, music videos, horror spoofs, and monster mashes."

Retrospective
Of retrospective assessments on the film, Gary Militzer of DVD Verdict called it "a mediocre made-for-TV horror/comedy" unworthy of a DVD release, while the 2004 DVD and Video Guide deemed it an "enjoyable cross between Night of the Living Dead and An American Werewolf in London, helped along by humor and a lively cast." AllMovie's Robert Firsching wrote: "Cultists and completists may find it worth a look for camp value alone, but most will want to give it a wide berth."

In Zombie Movies: The Ultimate Guide (2012), Glenn Kay called the film "lavishly produced, but not particularly thrilling," adding that it "has a sickening cuteness to it." Vampire fiction scholar John L. Flynn referred to the film as "a hodgepodge of horror film cliches." John Stanley wrote in Creature Features (2000) that the film was a "violent TV-movie vacillating between graveyard humor and shock thrills." Academic Peter Dendle noted in The Zombie Movie Encyclopedia: "Even zombie movie completists will have a hard time stomaching this lame made-for-TV drivel," also comparing elements of the film's dance sequence to that of the Jackson "Thriller" video, and likening other elements of the film to those of Children Shouldn't Play with Dead Things (1972) and Grease (1978). Similarly in Cyborgs, Santa Claus and Satan: Science Fiction, Fantasy, and Horror Films Made for Television (2009), media scholar Fraser S. Sherman wrote: "This pointless film spends far too much time with teens partying and dancing, and pays much more attention to visuals than to plot."

Home media
Vidmark released The Midnight Hour on VHS in May 1989. Anchor Bay Entertainment re-released it on VHS on July 20, 1999 with a Region 1 DVD following on September 19, 2000. Both releases of the film are out of print.

Soundtrack
The film features these songs, as adapted from the film credits:

"In the Midnight Hour" by Wilson Pickett
"Bad Moon Rising" by Creedence Clearwater Revival
"Li'l Red Riding Hood" by Sam the Sham and the Pharaohs
"Baby I'm Yours" by Barbara Lewis
"Mama Told Me Not To Come" by Three Dog Night
"Devil or Angel" by Bobby Vee

"How Soon Is Now?" by The Smiths
"Sea of Love" by Del Shannon
"Get Dead" by Shari Belafonte-Harper
"Clap for the Wolfman" by The Guess Who
"Sea of Love" by Phil Phillips

References

Sources

External links

1985 television films
1985 horror films
1980s comedy horror films
American comedy horror films
American horror television films
American vampire films
Films about curses
Halloween horror films
Films directed by Jack Bender
1980s monster movies
Vampire comedy films
Vampires in television
American werewolf films
Television about werewolves
Films about witchcraft
Witchcraft in television
1985 films
Films scored by Brad Fiedel
1985 comedy films
1980s English-language films
1980s American films